Cardamine oligosperma is a species of Cardamine known by the common name little western bittercress. It is native to western North America from Alaska to California to Colorado, where it grows in moist mountain habitats.

Description
Cardamine oligosperma is an annual or biennial herb growing from a taproot. It produces one or more upright, branching stems. The plentiful leaves are divided into many leaflets. The plant generally has a rosette of leaves at the base with leaflets nearly round in shape. The inflorescence is several centimeters long and bears many flowers with white petals just a few millimeters in length. The fruit is a silique up to 2.5 centimeters long.

Uses 
The leaves are edible raw and other tender parts of the plant can be cooked, though have also been eaten raw.

References

External links

Jepson Manual Treatment - Cardamine oligosperma
USDA Plants Profile; Cardamine oligosperma
Cardamine oligosperma - Photo gallery

oligosperma
Edible plants
Flora of the Western United States
Flora of Western Canada
Flora of the Sierra Nevada (United States)
Flora of California
Flora of Alaska
Flora without expected TNC conservation status